A double referendum was held in Puerto Rico on 4 November 1952. Voters were asked whether they approved of amendments to the constitution regarding federal order and whether private schools should be financed with public money. Both were approved by 87.8% of voters.

Results

Constitutional amendments

Private school funding

References

1952 referendums
1952 2
1952 in Puerto Rico
November 1952 events in the United States